Coswig may refer to:

Coswig, Saxony, in the district of Meißen, Saxony
Coswig, Anhalt, in the district of Wittenberg, Saxony-Anhalt
Coswig (Verwaltungsgemeinschaft), a "formed community" in  the district of Wittenberg, Saxony-Anhalt, Germany